The Mayor of Bedford is a directly elected mayor responsible for the executive function, and ceremonial duty of Bedford Borough Council in Bedfordshire. The incumbent is Dave Hodgson of the Liberal Democrats who succeeded Frank Branston in 2009.

History

The first known reference to a Mayor of Bedford in England was in 1264.

Prior to the Municipal Corporations Act, 1835, the Mayor of Bedford came into office on 29 September. The first Mayor of the reformed Corporation came into office on 1 January 1836, and subsequent Mayors on 9 November. After the Local Government Act, 1948, and the Local Government Act, 1972, the Mayors from 1949 onwards came into office in May. The civic mayor was replaced by a directly elected mayor in 2002.

Since April 2009 the Borough of Bedford is a unitary authority, with the executive having the powers and functions of both a non-metropolitan district and a non-metropolitan county.

Referendum
Bedford held a referendum on 21 February 2002 on whether to introduce a directly elected mayor after a petition was signed by at least 5% of the electorate. The move was approved with 11,316 voting in favour and 5,357 against on a turnout of 15.5%.

Elections
The first mayoral election on 17 October 2002 saw independent Frank Branston elected as mayor.

2002

2007
In 2007 Frank Branston was re-elected as mayor.

2009 By-Election
A by-election took place on 15 October 2009 after the death of the previous incumbent, Frank Branston in August 2009. The by-election was won by the Liberal Democrat, Dave Hodgson.

2011
Dave Hodgson was elected to a full term as mayor on 5 May 2011 after being elected to finish the term of Frank Branston in 2009.

2015
The 2015 mayoral election took place on 7 May 2015, the same day as elections of Bedford Borough Councillors, and the UK General Election. Hodgson was re-elected.

2019
The 2019 mayoral election took place on 2 May 2019, the same day as the 2019 Bedford Borough Council election, part of the 2019 United Kingdom local elections.

References

Bedford

Borough of Bedford